Marielle Hall (born January 28, 1992) is a long-distance runner from the United States. She competed in the Women's 5000 meters event at the 2015 World Championships in Athletics in Beijing, China as well as the Women's 10,000 meters final at the 2016 Summer Olympics in Rio de Janeiro, Brazil.

Career

IAAF Track and Field and Cross Country

USA Track and Field

At the 2017 Boston Athletic Association road 5 km in April 2017, Hall placed 4th in a time of 15:08.

US Road Championships

NCAA
For college, Hall chose to compete for the Texas Longhorns women's cross country where she was a 3-Time All-American, Seven-Time Big-12 Champion. Hall won 5000 meters title at 2014 NCAA Division I Outdoor Track and Field Championships in a tactical 15:35.11 for the Texas Longhorns. During the 2013 cross country season, Hall won the individual title at the Big 12 Conference cross country championships and took 29th place for All-American honors at NCAA national championships.

Hall graduated from University of Texas at Austin in 2014.

Personal
Born in Philadelphia, Hall grew up in Mount Laurel, New Jersey. She graduated from the Haddonfield Memorial High School in Haddonfield, New Jersey in 2010 and University of Texas at Austin in 2014. In Fall 2014, Hall moved to train with coach Derek Thompson and the Juventus Track Club of Philadelphia. In Fall 2017, Hall moved to coach Jerry Schumacher's Portland based group Bowerman Track Club. In Fall 2021, Hall moved to coach Kurt Benninger in Providence, Rhode Island.

References

External links
 United States at the 2015 World Championships in Athletics
 Marielle Hall Profile on Instagram
 Marielle Hall University of Texas profile
 Athletics Marielle Hall profile
 
 Marielle Hall press at 2015 NYRR Millrose Games
 Marielle Hall IAAF Diamond League profile

American female long-distance runners
American female middle-distance runners
Haddonfield Memorial High School alumni
World Athletics Championships athletes for the United States
Olympic track and field athletes of the United States
Living people
1992 births
People from Haddonfield, New Jersey
People from Mount Laurel, New Jersey
Sportspeople from Camden County, New Jersey
Track and field athletes from New Jersey
Track and field athletes from Philadelphia
Texas Longhorns women's track and field athletes
Athletes (track and field) at the 2016 Summer Olympics